Subdoluseps bowringii, also known commonly as Bowring's supple skink, Bowring's writhing skink, and the Christmas Island grass-skink, is a species of lizard in the family Scincidae. The species is native to Southeast Asia.

Etymology
The specific name, bowringii, is in honor of either John Charles Bowring, who was a British amateur naturalist and businessman in Hong Kong, or his father John Bowring, who was a British diplomat and a governor of Hong Kong.

Geographic range
West Malaysia, Pulau Tioman, Johor Pulau Besar, Pulau Sibu; India (Andaman Islands),
Philippines (Sulu Archipelago),
Indonesia (Borneo, Sumatra ?, Java, Sulawesi),
China (Hong Kong ), Singapore, India,
Indochina west to Myanmar (= Burma), Vietnam, Thailand, Laos, Cambodia,
Australia (Cook Islands)

Type locality: Hong Kong.

References

Further reading
Boulenger GA (1887). Catalogue of the Lizards in the British Museum (Natural History). Second Edition. Volume III ... Scincidae .... London: Trustees of the British Museum (Natural History). (Taylor and Francis, printers). xii + 575 pp. + Plates I–XL. (Lygosoma bowringii, pp. 308–309 + Plate XXIII, figure 3).
Boulenger GA (1887). "An account of the Scincoid Lizards collected from Burma for the Genoa Civic Museum by Messrs. G.B. Comotto and L. Fea". Annali del Museo Civico di Storia Naturale di Genova, Series 2, 4: 618–624. (Lygosoma comotti, new species, p. 622).
Freitas ES, Datta-Roy A, Karanth P, Grismer LL, Siler CD (2019). "Multilocus phylogeny and a new classification for African, Asian and Indian supple and writhing skinks (Scincidae: Lygosominae)". Zoological Journal of the Linnean Society 186 (4): 1067–1096. (Subdoluseps bowringii, new combination).
Günther A (1864). The Reptiles of British India. London: The Ray Society. (Taylor & Francis, printers). xxvii + 452 pp. + Plates I-XXVI. (Eumeces bowringii, new species, p. 91).

External links

Subdoluseps
Reptiles of Southeast Asia
Reptiles of Thailand
Reptiles of the Philippines
Fauna of Christmas Island
Reptiles described in 1864
Taxa named by Albert Günther
Reptiles of Borneo